Wappinschaw is the 1995 album from Cindytalk released by Touched Recordings. "The first time ever..." is a cover of a Ewan MacColl song. "Wheesht" includes a reading by Alasdair Gray from Lanark. "Traumlose Nächte" means "Dreamless Nights". On the CD, "Muster" (from the Prince Of Lies 7") is appended to "Hush" after about five minutes of silence. "Prince Of Lies" itself differs from the version on the 7". "Empty Hand" is shorter than the versions on Secrets And Falling and the Sound From Hands compilation.The cover art for "Wappinschaw" was a collaboration between Gordon Sharp and London-based photographer Steve Gullick.

Track listing
 The First Time Ever...
 A Song Of Changes
 Empty Hand
 Return to Pain
 Wheesht
 Snowkisss
 Secrets and Falling
 Disappear
 Traumlose Nächte
 And Now in Sunshine
 Prince of Lies
 Hush

Gordon Sharp - voice, piano and tapes
Paul Middleton - drums and percussion
David Ros - guitar and sampling
Kevin Rich - bass guitar
Darryl Moore - guitar
Matthew Kinnison - bass guitar and tapes
John Byrne - guitar and bass guitar
Andrew Moon - additional drumming
Lars Rudolph - trumpet
Tracy Hankins - violin
Calum Williams - bagpipes
Jean Rowena Sharp - 'Coulter's Candy' voice

Versions
 LP 1995 Touched Recordings, Touch 1 LP
 CD 1995 Touched Recordings, Touch 1

Cindytalk albums
Experimental music albums
1995 albums